Busby Islet (also known as Bushy Island and Anchorage Island) is an islet in the  Australian state of  South Australia located in Nepean Bay on the north coast of Kangaroo Island  about  north of the municipal seat of Kingscote.  The islet and adjoining areas are notable as habitat for bird life.  The islet has enjoyed protected area status since 1909 and since at least 1972, have been part of the Busby Islet Conservation Park.

Description
Busby Islet along with the Beatrice Islets are three high points on the southern edge of a spit that is exposed at low water.

Formation, geology and oceanography
The conditions for the creation of The Spit and therefore Busby Islet and the Beatrice Islets became possible about 7500 years ago when sea levels reached current levels. The islet is composed of sand and sandgrit, which has formed into 'low dunes' at the islet's summit.

Flora and fauna

Flora
As of 1996, Busby Islet was reported as supporting a ‘low shrubland of highly salt-tolerant succulents such as grey samphire, glassworts and Austral seablite’ while the summit of the island supports ‘marginally less salt tolerant nitre bush and African boxthorn.’

Fauna
Sources dated 1987 and 1996 suggest that bird species are the dominant fauna.  As of 1980 and 1981, the following bird species were observed on Busby Islet: Australian pelican, black-faced shag, little pied cormorant, little black cormorant, pied cormorant, white-faced heron, sacred ibis, chestnut teal, black swan, brown falcon, grey plover, pied oystercatcher, sooty oystercatcher, ruddy turnstone, silver gull, pacific gull, caspian tern, fairy tern, crested tern, sharp-tailed sandpiper, red-necked stint, curlew sandpiper, eastern curlew, whimbrel, greenshank, rock parrot, raven and little grassbird.

Little penguins 
Historically, little penguins could be found in burrows in the vicinity of Busby Islet and its adjacent sandbanks. The species was not listed in the bird list published in the management plan for the Busby Islet Conservation Park, which was collated during surveys in 1980 and 1981. As of 2011, this colony is believed to be extinct.

History

European discovery and use
Busby Islet is reported as being originally named by Matthew Flinders as Bushy Island.  However, it is reported that a possible spelling error has resulted in Busby Island being the official name since at least 1869.  The name Anchorage Island has also been used for the islet.  The name Bushy Island is still used on British Admiralty charts and within American sources.
Busby Islet is one of the island sites from which guano was mined under licence from the South Australian Government prior to 1919.

Protected areas status

Busby Islet first received protected area status on 13 May 1909 under the Birds Protection Act 1900.  The islets were subsequently proclaimed as a fauna reserve under the Fauna Conservation Act 1964, dedicated again in 1967 ‘for the conservation of wildlife habitat’ and then as a conservation park under the National Parks and Wildlife Act 1972  in 1972. 16 March 1967  As of 2012, the waters adjoining the islet is within a sanctuary zone within the Encounter Marine Park.  Accordingly, as of October 2014, the islet has been a 'no entry' area as part of the marine park's regulatory regime.
Busby Islet is also part of a larger area that includes the extent of The Spit within Nepean Bay including the Beatrice Islets and which was included in a non-statutory listing of nationally important wetlands located in South Australia as part of A Directory of Important Wetlands in Australia.

See also
List of islands of Australia

Citations and references

Citations

References
	

     	

 

Islands of South Australia
Uninhabited islands of Australia
Kangaroo Island